is a former badminton player from Japan who won Japanese national and major international titles from the late 1960s to the mid-1970s. 

Though highly competitive in singles, Machiko's greatest success came in women's doubles with Etsuko Takenaka Toganoo. They shared the prestigious All-England Championships in 1972, 1973, and 1975. They won the Danish Open women's doubles title in 1970 and 1974, the quadrennial Asian Games championship in 1970, and the U.S. Open women's doubles title, on their only try, in 1970. Aizawa played on Japan's 1972 Uber Cup (women's international) team which retained the world championship, and its 1975 team which lost the title to Indonesia.

References 

Japanese female badminton players
Living people
Asian Games medalists in badminton
Badminton players at the 1970 Asian Games
Badminton players at the 1974 Asian Games
Asian Games gold medalists for Japan
Asian Games bronze medalists for Japan
Year of birth missing (living people)
Medalists at the 1970 Asian Games
Medalists at the 1974 Asian Games
20th-century Japanese women